Rauno "Rane" Korpi (born June 25, 1951 in Tampere, Finland) is a Finnish ice hockey coach. He coached Tappara to three consecutive Finnish Championships in SM-liiga during the years 1986-1988. He has also won one additional Finnish Championship Gold, one Silver medal and one Bronze medal. Korpi has been chosen three times as The Coach of the Year in Finland. Other teams coached by Korpi include TuTo, EC KAC, and EV Zug.

Korpi has also coached Finland's national ice hockey team during the years 1986-1987. He has coached Women's national teams and Junior national teams as well.

Korpi is the father of Kiira Korpi, Olympic-level figure skater and winner of European Championships Bronze medal.

References

1951 births
Living people
Finnish ice hockey players
Finland men's national ice hockey team coaches
Ice hockey people from Tampere